Lords of the Middle Sea is a 1978 board wargame published by Chaosium. Designed by Lynn Willis, with art by William Church and Gene Day.

Gameplay
Lords of the Middle Sea is a game which North America has been drastically altered by cataclysms by 2401 A.D.

Reception
W. G. Armintrout reviewed Lords of the Middle Sea in The Space Gamer No. 21. Armintrout commented that "This is a game which tries too hard. It has no tactical richness, despite the pretty pictures in the rulebook. The role-playing is trivial and gets in the way."

Eric Goldberg reviewed Lords of the Middle Sea in Ares Magazine #1, rating it a 7 out of 9. Goldberg commented that "this game is not a fantasy game with a science fiction background; rather it is a well-balanced presentation of medieval forces doing battle with the aid of supernatural and technological help. While this is a fairly simple strategic game, there is enough of substance to warrant several playings."

Roleplaying Game
In 2020 Chaosium announced that the Lords of the Middle Sea setting was to be the basis of a tabletop role-playing game using Basic Roleplaying and written by John Snead.

References

External links

Board games introduced in 1978
Chaosium games